The barred seabass (Centrarchops chapini) is a species of marine ray-finned fish, a cavebass from the family Dinopercidae, which is native to the coastal waters of the Democratic Republic of the Congo and Angola. It is important to local commercial fisheries. This species is the only known member of the genus Centrarchops. The specific name honours the American ornithologist James Chapin (1889-1964).

References

Dinopercidae

Fish described in 1923
Marine fish of Africa